Gregory Nelson Johnston (born January 14, 1965) is a Canadian former professional ice hockey defenceman.

Early life 
Johnston was born in Barrie, Ontario. As a youth, he played in the 1977 Quebec International Pee-Wee Hockey Tournament with a minor ice hockey team from Barrie.

Career 
Johnston played 187 games in the NHL, most of them for the Boston Bruins, but also a few for the Toronto Maple Leafs. He has also played in the AHL for various teams, and in Europe for various teams in Germany's DEL and Sweden's Elitserien.

Career statistics

References

External links

1965 births
Berlin Capitals players
Boston Bruins draft picks
Boston Bruins players
Canadian ice hockey defencemen
Hershey Bears players
Kassel Huskies players
Living people
Maine Mariners players
Modo Hockey players
Moncton Golden Flames players
Newmarket Saints players
St. John's Maple Leafs players
Toronto Marlboros players
Toronto Maple Leafs players
Ice hockey people from Simcoe County
Sportspeople from Barrie
Canadian expatriate ice hockey players in Germany
Canadian expatriate ice hockey players in Sweden